The Governor of Sahil is the chief executive of the Somaliland region of Sahil, leading the region's executive branch. Governors of the region are appointed to office by the Somaliland president. The current governor of Sahil is Ahmed Osman Hassan.

See also
Sahil
Politics of Somaliland

References

External links

Governors of Sahil